The Urlătoarea is a right tributary of the river Prahova in Romania. It flows into the Prahova in Poiana Țapului. It is known for the Urlătoarea waterfall.

References

Rivers of Romania
Rivers of Prahova County